Mahatma is a 2009 Indian Telugu-language action drama film written and directed by Krishna Vamsi. This film stars Srikanth (in his 100th film) and Bhavana. The music was composed by Vijay Antony with cinematography by Sharat and editing by Gautham Raju. The film was to release on 2 October, coinciding with Gandhi Jayanti. Due to censor issues, the film's release was postponed by a week to 9 October 2009. The film was dubbed in Tamil as Puthiya Thalapathy and in Hindi as Ek Aur Mahanayak in 2009. The film won four Nandi Awards. The film was a box office success.

Plot
Dasu (Srikanth) is a rowdy in a basti in Hyderabad. He makes a living out of "settlement of petty issues". A young lawyer named Krishnaveni (Bhavana) gets him bail in a petty case, and their acquaintance soon develops into romance after a series of events. On the other hand, a politician-cum-businesswoman (Jyothi) plans to set up SEZ in that basti that move is protested by dwellers headed by a genuine leader (Sekhar). Meanwhile, a local politician-cum-rowdy leader named Dada (Jaya Prakash Reddy) also protests against the businesswoman and seeks Rs. 200 crores if she wants to set up SEZ there. Dasu initially believes Dada as a good politician and works for him. When Dada tries to take advantage of Dasu, he realizes his fault and plans to contest against him on a newly floated Mahatma party. How Krishnavani and local theatre artistes bring a change in Dasu and make him realize the importance of Mahatma Gandhi's ideology is a core point of the movie.

Cast 

 Srikanth as Dasu
 Bhavana as Krishnaveni
 Navneet Kaur
 Yana Gupta
 Brahmanandam as English Professor
 Jaya Prakash Reddy as Dada
 Jyothi as Politician/Businesswoman
 Paruchuri Gopala Krishna as Advocate
 Sekhar as Leader of Dwellers
 Ahuti Prasad as Inspector B. K.
 Sampoornesh Babu as Protester
 Duvvasi Mohan
 Thagubothu Ramesh
 Uttej
 Ramjagan
 Charmee Kaur as an item number

Soundtrack 

The song "Yem Jaruguthundi" was inspired from the song "Aen Ennaku Mayakkam" from the movie Naan Avanillai. Similarly "Jajjanaka" from "Naaka Mukka" song from the movie Kadhalil Vizhunthen and the song "Dailamo" from "Dailamo Dailamo" from the film Dishyum.

Awards
Nandi Awards - 2009
 Best Supporting Actor - Ramjagan
 Best Male Playback Singer - S. P. Balasubrahmanyam
 Special Jury Award for Best Performance - Srikanth
 Best Female Dubbing Artist - Soumya

See also
 List of artistic depictions of Mohandas Karamchand Gandhi

References

External links 
 

2009 films
2000s Telugu-language films
Films directed by Krishna Vamsi
Films scored by Vijay Antony